The 1977 New Mexico Lobos football team was an American football team that represented the University of New Mexico in the Western Athletic Conference (WAC) during the 1977 NCAA Division I football season.  In their fourth season under head coach Bill Mondt, the Lobos compiled a 5–7 record (2–5 against WAC opponents) and were outscored by a total of 319 to 272.

Preston Dennard, Jake Gonzales, Smokey Turman, and Marion Chapman were the team captains. The team's statistical leaders included Noel Mazzone with 1,085 passing yards, Mike Williams with 1,096 rushing yards, Preston Dennard with 341 receiving yards, and Jim Haynes with 43 points scored.

Schedule

References

New Mexico
New Mexico Lobos football seasons
New Mexico Lobos football